Tilla Durieux Park (German: Tilla-Durieux-Park) is a park near Potsdamer Platz in Berlin, Germany.

External links
 

Parks in Berlin